Jean-Robert-Nicolas Lucas de Montigny (9 December 1747 – 29 January 1810) was a French sculptor. His son Jean-Marie-Nicolas Lucas de Montigny was a politician.

Life
After training in his initial birthplace of Rouen, he entered the école des Beaux-Arts de Paris in 1774. He actively supported the French Revolution, sculpting busts of Voltaire, Jean-Jacques Rousseau, Mirabeau and Jean-Barthélémy Le Couteulx de Canteleu. In 1809 he married the daughter of the sculpture dealer Roland. He died in Paris.

Works

Louvre
 Préville the actor as Figaro, bust
 Saint-Huberty as Dido, statuette
 Mirabeau, bust

Other
 Voltaire standing and reading, statuette, Institut et musée Voltaire in Geneva, acquired in 1957 by the Pictet family and donated to the city of Geneva
 Jean-Jacques Rousseau, collection of the Royal Museums of Fine Arts of Belgium, Brussels

References

18th-century French sculptors
1747 births
1810 deaths
Artists from Rouen